Urdinarrain is a city in the center-south of the province of Entre Ríos, Argentina, 240 km southeast from the provincial capital Paraná and 40 km west from Gualeguaychú, on Provincial Route 20.

The original small settlement was populated by many newcomers, mainly European immigrants, after the arrival of the railway line on 23 September 1890. It was declared a first-category municipality on 21 August 1942. The current name of the city is an homage to General Manuel Antonio Urdinarrain (1801–1868), who fought alongside local caudillos Francisco Ramírez and Justo José de Urquiza.

References

 
 Intendency of Urdinarrain — Official website.
 Urdi — Portal of the city.

Populated places in Entre Ríos Province
Cities in Argentina
Entre Ríos Province
Argentina